Roncador oil field is a large oil and gas field located in the Campos Basin,  off the coast of Brazil, northeast from Rio de Janeiro.

History
The field was discovered in October 1996 and is located in P-36 block. The operator Petrobras had been preparing for a deepwater technical challenge such as Roncador under its PROCAP (Petrobras Technological Development Program on Deep Water Production Systems) and PROCAP-2000 initiatives. The field is considered to be a major breakthrough. Roncador has 53 production wells, 29 injection wells and is anticipated to peak in 2014.

Oil platform accident
Until 2001, the field was developed using Petrobras 36 oil production platform. In the early hours of March 15, 2001 there were two unexplained explosions in the aft starboard column. At the time there were 175 people on the platform; 11 were killed. Following the explosions, the platform developed a 16° list, sufficient to allow down-flooding from the submerged fairlead boxes. Marine salvage teams tried over the weekend to save the platform by pumping nitrogen and compressed air into the tanks to expel the water, but they abandoned the rig after bad weather.

Ownership
The field is fully owned and operated by Petrobras. It is estimated that Petrobras will spend nearly $2.2 billion on a project finance basis.

Reservoir
Roncador has 3 billion barrels of proven recoverable oil reserves. Due to its size the field was divided into four sections: Module 1 (28-31° API), Module 2 (18° API), Module 3 (22° API) and Module 4 (18° API) with subsequent division of the project into several phases.

Production

Field development on Roncador was divided into several phases:
The Module 1
Module1, Early Production Phase started producing in January 1999 from a well  through FPSO Seillean. This phase was set to produce early in order to create revenue for the project to cover the huge costs for development of the whole field. Production during this phase was 20,000 bbl/d.
The Module 1, Phase One consisted of several subsea wells connected to semisubmersible production facility P-36 which started producing in May 2000, which sank on March 15, 2001, due to two explosions leading to human casualties. At that time, P-36 was considered to be world's biggest semisubmersible which produced 84,000 bbl/d and 1.3  MMcm/d of gas.
Module 1A, Phase One was started after the P-36 sunk on Module 1 to get the field producing as soon as possible. In December 2002, the field started producing again .
Module 1A, Phase Two included fabrication and installation of P-52 platform connected to 18 subsea production wells and 11 water injection wells. Engineering and construction of P-52 platform which was built for a total cost of $1 billion was contracted to a consortium of Technip and Keppel FELS in December 2003. The platform became operational in November 2007 with 20,000 bbl/d peaking to 180,000 in second part of 2008. The peak gas production from this phase was 3.2 MMcm/d.
Module 2 development consists of 17 long horizontal wells 11 of which are production wells and 6 - for water injection. Considered one of the largest in the world and weighing 66,224 tonnes, the P-54 FPSO vessel was assigned for production from Module 2. P-54 was converted from VLCC Barao De Maua large carrier at a $628 million contract with Jurong Shipyard, a subsidiary of SembCorp Marine and a $25 million subcontract with Aker Solutions which provided the processing equipment for the vessel. It became operational on December 11, 2007. This phase of the project boost the overall production from the field to 460,000 bbl/d.
Module 3 development consists of 11 add-on and 7 water injection wells and includes the P-55 with production capacity of 180,000 bbl/d and gas compression capacity of 6 MMcm/d. The platform is expected to start production in 2011.
Module 4 will have the capacity to produce 180,000 bbl/d and compress 6 MMcm/d of natural gas.

See also

Petrobras 36 Oil Platform
Campos Basin
Santos Basin

References

External links
Petrobas official site
The Seillean FPSO vessel at Early Production Phase (from Offshore Technology)
Map of Roncador field showing the Modules (from Rigzone)

Oil fields of Brazil
Petrobras oil and gas fields
Campos Basin